Elbert Williams was an American baseball pitcher in the Negro leagues.  He played with several teams from 1929 to 1935. 

Williams was discovered by Ramiro Ramírez and signed by the Havana Red Sox owner Syd Pollock for the 1929 season.

References

External links
 and Seamheads

Brooklyn Eagles players
Homestead Grays players
Louisville White Sox players
Monroe Monarchs players
Year of birth missing
Year of death missing
Baseball pitchers